Milton Schwartz was an American who worked for Soviet Military Intelligence GRU during World War II.  A  1943 message, later decrypted by the Army Signals Intelligence Corp,  revealed Schwartz's activity on behalf of the GRU to be of such value that a request was put in for $1200 to assist Schwartz in personal financial matters.

Schwartz's code name with the GRU, and deciphered by the Venona project is "Matvey".

References
Who was 'Venona's' 'Ales'? cryptanalysis and the Hiss case Intelligence & National Security, Taylor & Francis Group,  Volume 18, Number 3 / September 2003, pgs. 45 - 72
 John Earl Haynes and Harvey Klehr, Venona: Decoding Soviet Espionage in America, Yale University Press (1999), pgs. 186, 364, 462.

Year of birth missing
Year of death missing
American spies for the Soviet Union
American people in the Venona papers
Espionage in the United States